Resesi (literally Recession) is a 1983 album by the Indonesian singer Chrisye. Recorded in collaboration with Jockie Soerjoprajogo and Eros Djarot after the latter's return from Germany, Resesi, which is Chrisye's sixth studio album, was inspired by the sound of The Police and featured songs influenced by CB radio and social criticism. It was a commercial hit upon release, selling 350,000 copies and being certified silver. In 2007 Rolling Stone Indonesia listed it as the 82nd best Indonesian album of all time.

Production
Following the failure of his album Pantulan Cita (Reflection of Dreams; 1981) and his disappointment with the film Seindah Rembulan (As Beautiful as the Moon), Chrisye had taken a long sabbatical. In early 1983 Eros Djarot, who had collaborated with the singer on the highly successful soundtrack album Badai Pasti Berlalu in 1977, returned to Indonesia after studying cinematography in Germany.  This inspired Chrisye to ask him to record a new album in collaboration with Jockie Soerjoprajogo. Although Djarot had not been involved in music for several years, he agreed.

On the album Chrisye provided vocals and played the bass, while Soerjoprajogo played several instruments – including the mandolin. They were joined by Ian Antono on the electric and acoustic guitars and Uce Hudioro on drums. Djarot served primarily as a songwriter. Recording was completed at Musica Studios' recording rooms number I and II, with H. Rusmin as operator. Soerjoprajogo arranged the music. The owner of Musica, Aciu Wijaya, suggested that they adopt a currently trending genre to ensure marketability; ultimately the result was similar to songs by The Police. Chrisye felt that Sting's bass performances for the band had made their songs more powerful; as such, he modeled his playing style after the British performer.

During his hiatus Chrisye had become involved in CB radio, listening but not broadcasting; this influenced the song "Polusi Udara". For the song "Sentuhan Cinta" Chrisye was joined by Hetty Koes Endang, who served as a backing vocalist. With Djarot's influence two of the songs – "Money" and "Resesi" – began taking a critical view of society. Meanwhile, Chrisye refused to sing "Malam Pertama", not speaking with Soerjoprajogo, until he was convinced to do so by Djarot. "Resesi" was chosen to be the album's title track after a vote.

Track listing

Release and reception
The album was released in February 1983. To promote the album three songs, "Lenny", "Hening", and "Malam Pertama", were released as singles; Chrisye also performed "Lenny" live on Aneka Ria Safari, a variety show on the state-owned broadcaster TVRI. Resesi was a commercial success, selling 350,000 copies and being certified silver. Chrisye saved his returns, saving towards a home for him and his wife. After this success, Chrisye would record another two collaborations with Soerjoprajogo and Djarot, Metropolitan and Nona (both 1984). He would continue to perform several of the tracks, including "Hening" and "Malam Pertama", in concerts until his death.

Frans Sartono, writing for Kompas after Chrisye's death in 2007, found the album to "cleverly" (cerdik) include white reggae influences from The Police. He suggests that the introduction of the title track "Resesi" is similar to The Police's "Walking on the Moon". Indonesian music critic Denny Sakri considered it a refreshing comeback for Chrisye.

Resesi has been reissued twice, once as a CD in 2004 and once as part of the Chrisye Masterpiece Trilogy Limited Edition in 2007. In 2007 Rolling Stone Indonesia selected it as the 82nd best Indonesian album of all time, the lowest ranked of Chrisye's albums three solo albums on the list.

References

Works cited

 

1983 albums
Chrisye albums
Indonesian-language albums